Suleima helianthana, the sunflower bud moth, is a species of moth of the family Tortricidae. It is found in central North America, from Mexico to Canada.

The wingspan is about 17 mm. It is a variable species. There are two generations per year.

The larvae feed on Helianthus species. They tunnel into the stalks and buds of their host plant.

References

Moths described in 1881
Eucosmini